Pabellón de Arteaga is municipality in the Mexican state of Aguascalientes. The city of Pabellón de Arteaga (2010 population: 28,633) serves as its municipal seat. The municipality had a population of 41,862 and an area of 199.33 km² (76.97 sq mi). Its largest other town is named Emiliano Zapata.

Demographics

As of 2010, the municipality had a total population of 41,862.

As of 2010, the city of Pabellón de Arteaga had a population of 28,633. Other than the city of Pabellón de Arteaga, the municipality had 300 localities, the largest of which (with 2010 populations in parentheses) were: Emiliano Zapata (2,995), classified as urban, and Las Ánimas (1,794), Santa Isabel (1,065), Santiago (1,020), and San Luis de Letras (1,018), classified as rural.

References

Link to tables of population data from Census of 2005 Instituto Nacional de Estadística, Geografía e Informática (INEGI)
Aguascalientes Enciclopedia de los Municipios de México

External links
Ayuntamiento de Pabellón de Arteaga Official website
Aguascalientes state government (in Spanish)

Municipalities of Aguascalientes